Thomas Day Singleton (Birth date unknown – November 25, 1833) was a slaveowner and United States representative from South Carolina. He was born near Kingstree, South Carolina but his birth date is unknown.

Singleton was a member of the South Carolina House of Representatives, 1826-1833. He was elected as a Nullifier to the Twenty-third Congress and served without having qualified, from March 3, 1833, until his death in Raleigh, North Carolina, November 25, 1833, while en route to Washington, D.C. He was buried in the Congressional Cemetery, Washington, D.C.

See also
List of United States Congress members who died in office (1790–1899)

References

1833 deaths
People from Kingstree, South Carolina
Nullifier Party members of the United States House of Representatives
Nullifier Party politicians
19th-century American politicians
Members of the South Carolina House of Representatives
Members of the United States House of Representatives from South Carolina
Burials at the Congressional Cemetery
Year of birth missing